Chak No. 71 N.B. is situated at Khushab Road about 4 km away from Sargodha City. It consists of Fatima Jinnah Colony, Sabharwal Colony and Aslam Colony.  The population of the village is about 2,000 persons.

Populated places in Sargodha District